Boiling Springs High School (BSHS) is located in Northern Spartanburg County. BSHS opened a new campus in the fall of 2019. The campus was funded through overwhelming community support for a bond referendum passed in the fall of 2016.

Notable alumni
Dylan Thompson, former quarterback for the University of South Carolina, San Francisco 49ers and L.A. Rams
Brooks Foster, wide receiver for North Carolina, drafted in fifth round of 2009 NFL Draft by the St. Louis Rams also played for Miami Dolphins and New York Jets

References

Public high schools in South Carolina
Schools in Spartanburg County, South Carolina